Conotrachelus similis is a species of true weevil in the beetle family Curculionidae.

References

Further reading

 
 

Molytinae
Articles created by Qbugbot
Beetles described in 1837